No Guts. No Glory. is the second studio album by Australian hard rock band Airbourne and the follow-up to their 2007 debut Runnin' Wild. The album was released on 8 March 2010, in Europe, Canada, Japan and Australia and on 20 April 2010 in the US.

The first single from the record was "No Way But the Hard Way" and was made available on iTunes on 9 February 2010.

Track listing

Special Edition bonus tracks 

The Japanese pressing replaces "Devil's Child" and "Kickin' It Old School" with "Heads Are Gonna Roll" – 3:48 as a bonus track.

Personnel 
Airbourne
 Joel O'Keeffe – lead vocals, lead guitar
 David Roads – rhythm guitar, backing vocals
 Justin Street – bass, backing vocals
 Ryan O'Keeffe – drums

Production
 Johnny K – producer, engineer
 Daniel Salcido, Matt Dougherty – engineers
 Mike Cashin – assistant engineer
 Mike Fraser – mixing at The Warehouse Studio, Vancouver
 Ted Jensen – mastering at Sterling Sound, New York City

Charts

References

External links 
 

2010 albums
Airbourne (band) albums
Roadrunner Records albums
Albums produced by Johnny K